Benen may refer to:

Steve Benen (born 1973), American political writer, blogger, and producer of The Rachel Maddow Show
Saint Benen (Benignus of Armagh; fl. AD 450), Irish chieftain
Benén, bard and author of Benén's Poem

See also
Benin (disambiguation)